Burton Creek State Park is a state park in the U.S. state of California, located in Placer County near Truckee. Situated on the outskirts of Tahoe City, the park offers  of unpaved roadway for hiking and cross-country skiing. The  park was established in 1976.

See also
 List of California state parks

References

External links
Burton Creek State Park

1976 establishments in California
Lake Tahoe
Parks in Placer County, California
Protected areas established in 1976
State parks of California